Capel Tygwydd is a hamlet in the community of Beulah, Ceredigion, Wales, which is 70.3 miles (113.1 km) from Cardiff and 191.7 miles (308.5 km) from London. Capel Tygwydd is represented in the Senedd by Elin Jones (Plaid Cymru) and is part of the Ceredigion constituency in the House of Commons.

References

See also 
 List of localities in Wales by population 

Villages in Ceredigion